Black Fire I is an oil on canvas abstract expressionist painting by Barnett Newman, completed in 1961.

Background
Black Fire I was sold to a private collector for $84.2 million ($84,165,000) on May 13, 2014, at Rockefeller Plaza in New York City, after a telephone bidding war, exceeding the estimations of $50 million made by the organizing house, Christie’s.

See also
 List of most expensive paintings

References

Works by Barnett Newman
1961 paintings